Powassan virus (POWV) is a Flavivirus transmitted by ticks, found in North America and in the Russian Far East. It is named after the town of Powassan, Ontario, where it was identified in a young boy who eventually died from it. It can cause encephalitis, an infection of the brain. No approved vaccine or antiviral drug exists. Prevention of tick bites is the best precaution.

Classification and occurrence
Powassan virus (POWV) is a Flavivirus named after the town of Powassan, Ontario, Canada, where it was identified in a 5-year-old boy who died from encephalitis in 1958. The virus exists in North America and causes long-term neurological sequelae. The first human case in the United States was found in 1970 in New Jersey and in Russia in 1978. , Powassan virus has been noted as the only tick-borne Flavivirus in North America with human pathogenicity.

Powassan virus is also found in the warm climate across Eurasia, where it is part of the tick-borne encephalitis virus-complex. It is found in the Russian Far East (Primorsky Krai) and appears to have been introduced there 70 years ago.

Evolution
Powassan virus is an RNA virus split into two separate lineages: Lineage I, labeled as the “prototype” lineage; and Lineage II, the deer tick virus (DTV) lineage. Lineage II has the most genetic variation, which indicates that it is most likely the ancestral lineage that split as a result of positive natural selection. DTV is very closely related to Powassan virus and a sequence analysis showed that the two viruses diverged about 200 years ago. Even though Lineage II has been predominant in POWV positive tick pools, both lineages have had confirmed cases of human disease in North America and Russia The lineages share 84% nucleotide sequences and 94% amino acid sequence identity. Cross-neutralization occurs among flaviviruses due to the conservation of the envelope protein; this is what contributes to the fact that the two lineages are “serologically indistinguishable.” As a result, the lineages are part of the same viral species.

According to the last data, evolutionary rate of Powassan virus is 3.3 × 10−5 nucleotide substitution per site per year (95% HPD, 2.0 × 10−5–4.7 × 10−5), which is significantly lower than values reported in the previous studies. The values is compatible with that of tick-borne encephalitis virus (TBEV) and louping-ill virus (LIV) (1.0 × 10−5–2.2 × 10−5 for TBEV and 5.7 × 10−6–3.9 × 10−5 for LIV).

The most recent common ancestor of modern POWV split into two independent genetic lineages between 2600 and 6030 years ago probably as a result of the Beringia flood about 11.72 thousand years ago.

Vectors
The virus can be transmitted with bites from altogether six known species of ticks; the following four species of Ixodes ticks: Ixodes cookei, Ixodes scapularis, Ixodes marxi and Ixodes spinipalpus and the ticks Dermacentor andersoni and Dermacentor variabilis.

People with POWV have been mostly confirmed as having one strain of POWV, the deer tick virus. Ix. scapularis is an important vector for the Deer Tick Virus, which plays a vital role in maintaining the POWV. Ix. scapularis is also a primary vector for the agent of Lyme disease, because they are generalist feeders and readily bite humans.

In Canada and the Northeastern United States Ixodes cookei is the predominant species, while Ix. scapularis is a significant vector in Minnesota and Wisconsin. POWV is transmitted when an infected tick bites a mammal; in humans the tick is typically Ix. scapularis. In North America, the lineages of the POWV are maintained in three main enzootic cycles involving three different tick species and their respective small to medium-sized woodland mammals.
POWV may infect Ix. cookei and woodchucks, or it may infect Ix. marxi and squirrels, and it can cycle between Ix. scapularis and white-footed mice.

Based on the time interval for other tick-borne diseases like Lyme disease and anaplasmosis, the time interval for transmission of POWV is expected to be less than 12 hours. Once the POWV reaches humans it cannot be transmitted to a feeding tick, therefore humans are considered "dead-end" hosts. , the fastest transmission time of DTV from a Ix. scapularis nymph to a mouse was no more than 15 minutes.

Symptoms
Powassan virus infection is rarely diagnosed as a cause of encephalitis; however, when it is, Powassan encephalitis is severe, and neurologic sequelae are common. Powassan encephalitis has symptoms compatible with acute disseminated encephalomyelitis, oftentimes making it difficult to diagnose. Powassan virus encephalitis is a challenge to diagnose because there are only a few laboratories that offer testing, the most effective being serologic testing.

There are currently no medications or approved vaccines to treat or prevent the POWV. People affected by Powassan virus generally first show symptoms 1 to 3 weeks after infection. The initial symptoms include fever, headache, nausea, occasional confusion, and weakness. With severe Powassan illnesses the victims should be hospitalized, because the symptoms do worsen. If not treated, symptoms could extend to meningoencephalitis, which may include: seizures, aphasia, cranial nerve palsies, paresis and altered mental status. Currently, the best ways to treat POWV illnesses include medications to reduce brain swelling, respiratory support and intravenous fluids. About 10% of POWV encephalitis cases are fatal and half the survivors have permanent symptoms that affect their brain. There were 33 confirmed cases of Powassan virus infection in the U.S. between 2001 and 2010.

A rare case of a five-month-old Connecticut infant boy contracting Powassan virus infection was published in 2017. He survived with normal motor and verbal development on follow-up at the age of 10 months, but a head MRI showed severely abnormal brain conditions, including scarring (gliosis) and softening (encephalomalacia) in the thalamus and basal ganglia on both sides, and volume loss and early mineralization in the left basal ganglia.

On October 28, 2019, former U.S. Senator Kay Hagan died after contracting Powassan virus in 2016. She was 66 years old.

In March 2022 the Connecticut Department of Public Health confirmed that a man aged in his 50s contracted Powassan virus in the state and was hospitalised with severe neurological symptoms, though he was later discharged from hospital to recover at home.

Epidemiology 
Powassan Virus (POWV) is the only tick-borne flavivirus  endemic in North America. POWV human illnesses have been reported in the United States, Canada and Russia. POWV has different genetic variations including deer tick virus (DTV) which is transmitted by the black legged deer tick, Ixodes scapularis. It has two distinct lineages. POWV lineage I is transmitted by the Ixodes cookei which is endemic in the Great Lakes region of the United States. POWV lineage II is transmitted by Ixodes scapularis which is endemic in the Northeast United States. Humans can become infected in 15-30 minutes after tick attachment.

Ixodes ticks have three life stages that require a host: larva, nymph and adult. Each stage requires a blood meal to progress to the next life stage. The nymph stage frequently bites humans and is the stage in which I. scapularis is most likely to infect a human host with a pathogen. The most common reservoir (or host) for I. scapularis are white-footed mouse and white-tail deer. The most common reservoirs for I. cookei are skunks, woodchucks and squirrels. Humans are incidental hosts which means the ticks do not need to feed on humans to survive, humans are merely the host they find at the time for their next blood meal.

In the US, the highest incidence of POWV is in Minnesota and Wisconsin, with Massachusetts and New York also having higher incidence than other states in the Great Lakes or Northeast region. POWV was included in the list of nationally notifiable diseases to the U.S. Centers for Disease Control and Prevention (CDC) in 2002. Between 2009 and 2018, 133 cases of neuroinvasive POWV and 12 cases of non-neuroinvasive POWV were reported to the CDC. Since its discovery in 1958, there have only been 150 reported human illnesses caused by POWV. The incidence rate of POWV in the United States was 1 case per year from 1958-2005, and has risen to an average of 10 cases per year since then.

Currently, POWV is detected with IgM antibody capture ELISA of an IgM immunofluorescence antibody (IFA) assay, plaque reduction neutralization test (PRNT), detection of virus-specific nucleic acids, isolation in culture, or a >4-fold increase in antibody titers from paired acute and convalescent sera. These specific tests for POWV can only be done at a state lab or the CDC. Diagnostic criteria as set by the CDC are: resides in an endemic area, reported tick exposure, and presented with fever, altered mental status, seizures and focal neurological deficits and blood, tissue or cerebrospinal fluid (CSF) are positive on Powassan IgM or Powassan PRNT tests.

Research
Scientists at Vaccine and Immunotherapy Center at The Wistar Institute have designed and tested the first-of-its-kind synthetic DNA vaccine candidate against Powassan virus (POWV), targeting portions of the virus envelope protein.

References

External links 
 Center for Disease Control (CDC): Preventing Ticks on Your Pets
 Tickborne Powassan virus infections among Wisconsin residents

Encephalitis
Flaviviruses
Tick-borne diseases